The People's Commissariat of the Workers' and Peasants' Inspection, also known as Rabkrin (РКИ, RKI; Workers' and Peasants' Inspectorate, WPI), was a governmental establishment in the Soviet Union of ministerial level (people's commissariat) that was responsible for scrutinizing the state, local and enterprise administrations.

Beginnings
On February 7, 1920, the Central Executive Committee of the Soviet Union established the Rabkrin to succeed the People’s Commissariat for State Control. The term "Rabkrin" comes from the Russian title, Narodniy Kommissariat Raboche-Krestyanskoy Inspekciyi, the People’s Commissariat of the Workers’ and Peasants’ Inspectorate.  Rabkrin was put in place to ensure the effectiveness of the newly-created Soviet government, which had experienced bureaucratic turmoil beginning with the Russian Revolution and had continued into the Russian Civil War.

The People’s Commissariat for State Control was a key institute for creating the Soviet Union, but its mismanagement of bureaucratic control led Vladimir Lenin to disband the council and to replace it with a more manageable division of government authority. The former commissar of the People’s Commissariat for State Control, Joseph Stalin, was placed in charge of the newly-formed agency, Rabkrin, which was to signal a new beginning of Soviet administration. Since it was a creation of the Soviet Union, it had no connection to the Russian Empire.

Under Lenin and Stalin 
The German biographer Isaac Deutscher described Rabkrin as follows:

"The Rabkrin... was set up to control every branch of the administration, from top to bottom, with a view to eliminating the two major faults, inefficiency and corruption, which the Soviet civil service had inherited from its Tsarist predecessor. It was to act as the stern and enlightened auditor for the whole rickety and creaking governmental machine; to expose abuses of power and red tape; and to train an élite of reliable civil servants for every branch of the government. The [Rabkrin] acted through teams of workers and peasants who were free at any time to enter the offices of any Commissariat and watch the work done there.... The whole bizarre scheme of inspection was one of Lenin's pet ideas. Exasperated by the inefficiency and dishonesty of the civil service, he sought to remedy them by extreme and ruthless "control from below," and the [Rabkrin] was to be the means.... The mill of officialdom, however, turned the workers themselves into bureaucrats. The Commissariat of the Inspectorate, as Lenin was to discover later on, became an additional source of muddle, corruption, and bureaucratic intrigue. In the end it became an unofficial but meddlesome police in charge of the civil service."

During its first three years of operation, Rabkrin was crucial in the development of the growing communist state. The Central Bureau of Complaints, founded in 1919, was a department of the Rabkrin whose sole purpose was to find and eliminate inefficiency within the state's administration. Any Soviet citizen could file a complaint against a government official through this bureau. Lenin saw this as giving a voice to the people and a say in their government. After failing its goals and having been severely criticized, such as by Lenin himself, it was  merged with the CPSU Party Control Committee in 1923 to become a joint control organ (PCC-WPI, TsKK-RKI) under a common chairman to oversee state, economy, and the Russian Communist Party.

After Lenin died in 1924, Stalin's rise to power saw the Complaints Bureau become a more sinister tool for the new leader. The Complaints Bureau was now used as a channel to encourage Soviet citizens to provide detailed accounts, including evidence and witnesses, of functionaries opposing the state or being part of anti-communist organizations. Many complaints were followed by quick court hearings for the accused, and most cases were then decided upon with or without evidence.

In 1929, the Complaints Bureau was combined with the All-Union Central Council of Trade Unions Complaint Bureau, another Soviet administrative establishment that was in charge of worker unionization. The merger led to a rise in complaints from both agriculture and industrial sectors
until 1934, the year of the abolition of Rabkrin.

 General Secretary of the Communist Party of the Soviet Union in 1922, Stalin entrusted the post of People's Commissar of the Workers' and Peasants' Inspectorate to his trusted ally Grigory Ordzhonikidze, who was in office from 1926 to 1930. Under new leadership, Rabkrin pushed for more industrial/military efficiency from other Soviet economic establishments, most notably the Supreme Soviet of the National Economy (Vesenkha) and the State Planning Commission (Gosplan). Along with Stalin’s first five-year plan (1928-1932), Rabkrin became responsible for seeking new industrial investments to reach maximum output with minimum input. From 1929 to 1932, power struggles between Vesenkha, which was charged with the task of increasing industrialization, and Rabkrin became more evident.

Constant investigations into Vensenkha's industrial efficiency led to claims from Rabkrin of neglect and deception. However, many of the reports were falsified, which typified the chaotic nature of Soviet bureaucratic control. The investigations into other Soviet institutions went hand in hand with the removal of Old Bolshevik members during the early stages of the Great Purge of 1936-1938. Stalin and his administration believed that certain individuals within Soviet establishments, like Vesenkha, were purposely sabotaging the economic growth of the Soviet Union. Rabkrin investigations conveniently provided enough evidence to convict thousands of government officials.

Within the People's Commissariat of Agriculture, Rabkrin investigations led to departmental dissatisfaction. Many officials felt the overpowered Soviet institution to be abusing its power and making it difficult for collectivized agriculture to succeed under strict procedures. Soviet peasants met the same criticism as internal departments reported peasants as drunks, debauchers, and saboteurs who opposed the Communist Party and its attempts at mass collectivization. Most of the reports were false and wrongly depicted the life of the peasantry, but they justified the authorities in placing extreme production quotas on the agriculture sector. They constantly kept the peasantry busy but made them less likely to take part in immoral behavior.

End
From November 1930 to October 1931, Andrei Andreyev headed Rabkrin. Like his predecessor, Ordzhonikidze, Andreyev pushed for greater industrial growth as well as military expansion. From October 1931 to January 1934, Yan Rudzutak replaced him. After the success of the first five-year plan, the Soviet economy had entered a period of expansion and financial security. Compared to other world powers at the time, which were experiencing the impacts of the Great Depression, the Soviet economy seemed unstoppable from an external perspective.

At the 17th Congress of the All-Union Communist Party, with its purpose being felt to have been served in creating a more efficient administrative and economic structure, Rabkrin was dissolved, and its functions were passed to the People's Control Commission. After the People’s Control Commission became responsible for productivity, an increase in labor unions became a support system for many Soviet citizens in the industrial areas, which led to less chaos caused by bureaucratic control.

Rabkrin is remembered for its restrictions and its confrontations with other Soviet establishments, but under Stalin’s reign, it met limited success in assisting in the creation of the Soviet economy.

People's Commissars of the Workers' and Peasants Inspection of the RSFSR 

Joseph Vissarionovich Stalin (February 24, 1920 - May 6, 1922)
Alexander Dmitrievich Tsyurupa (May 6, 1922 - April 28, 1923)
Valerian Vladimirovich Kuibyshev (April 28 - July 6, 1923)
Aleksey Semyonovich Kiselyov (July 7, 1923 - February 2, 1924)
Nikolai Mikhailovich Shvernik (February 2, 1924 - November 30, 1925)
Nikifor Ilyich Ilyin (November 30, 1925 - March 10, 1934)

People's Commissars of the Workers and Peasants Inspection of the USSR 

 Valerian Vladimirovich Kuibyshev (July 6, 1923 - August 5, 1926)
 Grigoriy Konstantinovich Ordzhonikidze (November 5, 1926 - November 10, 1930) 
Andrey Andreevich Andreyev (November 22, 1930 - October 9, 1931)
Jan Ernestovich Rudzutak (October 9, 1931 - February 11, 1934)

See also

People's Control Commission
Five-year plans of the Soviet Union

References

 

Soviet state institutions
1920 establishments in Russia
1934 disestablishments in the Soviet Union
Government audit